Mavria is a village in the municipal unit of Gortyna, Arcadia, Greece. It is located near the left bank of the river Alfeios, 1 km north of Kyparissia, 4 km southeast of Karytaina and 9 km northwest of Megalopoli. Mavria had a population of 31 in 2011.  There is a lignite mine east of the village.

The ancient city of Trapezus was situated near the village.

Population

See also

List of settlements in Arcadia

References

External links
History and information about Mavria
 Mavria on GTP Travel Pages

Gortyna, Arcadia
Populated places in Arcadia, Peloponnese